The 1957 Stanford Indians football team represented Stanford University in the 1957 NCAA University Division football season. The team was coached by Chuck Taylor in his seventh year as head coach. Taylor was a popular coach who had led the Indians to the 1952 Rose Bowl and who had been an  All-American player for the Indians who starred on the undefeated 1940 "Wow Boys" team that won the 1941 Rose Bowl and the national championship in several polls. Just before the team's final game against archrival California, Taylor announced he was retiring as head coach to become assistant athletic director of the university.

Schedule

Game summaries

California

    
    
    
    

The 60th Big Game was held just a few days after Stanford head coach Taylor announced he would step down following the end of the season to serve as the school's assistant athletic director. Coming into the game, the Indians had won just once in Taylor's 6 previous Big Games, but vowed to win this game for their beloved head coach. Although Stanford had relied on its passing attack from quarterback Jack Douglas all season, it was the running game that gave the team the lead in the second quarter on fullback Chuck Shea's 9-yard run. Shea would rush for 155 yards on the day. California answered, but the point after was blocked, and Stanford nursed a 7–6 lead into the third quarter, when Douglas ran in for another score. California answered late, but the Indians held on to fulfill their vow to their outgoing coach and bring the overall Big Game series record at 25–25–10. Taylor would become Stanford's athletic director in 1963 and serve in that role until 1971.

References

Stanford
Stanford Cardinal football seasons
Stanford Indians football